A tertiary source is an index or textual consolidation of already published primary and secondary sources that does not provide additional interpretations or analysis of the sources.  Some tertiary sources can be used as an aid to find key (seminal) sources, key terms, general common knowledge and established mainstream science on a topic. The exact definition of tertiary varies by academic field. 

Academic research standards generally do not accept tertiary sources such as encyclopedias as citations, although survey articles are frequently cited rather than the original publication.

Overlap with secondary sources 
Depending on the topic of research, a scholar may use a bibliography, dictionary, or encyclopedia as either a tertiary or a secondary source. This causes some difficulty in defining many sources as either one type or the other.

In some academic disciplines, the differentiation between a secondary and tertiary source is relative.

In the United Nations International Scientific Information System (UNISIST) model, a secondary source is a bibliography, whereas a tertiary source is a synthesis of primary sources.

Types of tertiary sources

As tertiary sources, encyclopedias, dictionaries, some textbooks, and compendia attempt to summarize, collect, and consolidate the source materials into an overview without adding analysis and synthesis of new conclusions. 

Indexes, bibliographies, concordances, and databases may not provide much textual information, but as aggregates of primary and secondary sources, they are often considered tertiary sources. However, they may also provide access to the full text or content of primary and secondary sources. Although tertiary sources are both primary and secondary, they are more towards a secondary source because of commentary and bias.

Almanacs, travel guides, field guides, and timelines are also examples of tertiary sources.

Survey or overview articles are usually tertiary, though review articles in peer-reviewed academic journals are generally considered secondary (not be confused with film, book, etc. reviews, which are primary-source opinions).

Some sources that are usually primary sources, such as user guides and manuals, are secondary or tertiary (depending on the nature of the material) when written by third parties.

See also
 Source text
 Third-party source

References 

 
History resources
Information science

de:Sekundärliteratur#Tertiärliteratur